The occupation of Greece by the Axis Powers began in April 1941 after Nazi Germany invaded the Kingdom of Greece to assist its ally, Fascist Italy, which had been at war with Allied Greece since October 1940. Following the conquest of Crete, all of Greece was occupied by June 1941. The occupation of the mainland lasted until Germany and its ally Bulgaria were forced to withdraw under Allied pressure in early October 1944. However, German garrisons remained in control of Crete and some other Aegean islands until after the end of World War II in Europe, surrendering these islands in May and June 1945.

Fascist Italy had initially declared war and invaded Greece in October 1940, but the Hellenic Army managed to push back the invading forces into neighboring Albania, then an Italian protectorate. Nazi Germany intervened on its ally's behalf in southern Europe. While most of the Hellenic Army was dislocated on the Albanian front to fend off the relentless Italian counter-attacks, a rapid German Blitzkrieg campaign commenced in April 1941, and by June (with the conquest of Crete) Greece was defeated and occupied. The Greek government went into exile, and an Axis collaborationist puppet government was established in the country. Greece's territory was divided into occupation zones run by the Axis powers, with the Germans administering the most important regions of the country themselves, including Athens, Thessaloniki and the strategic Aegean Islands. Other regions of the country were given to Germany's partners, Italy and Bulgaria.

The occupation ruined the Greek economy and brought terrible hardships to the Greek civilian population. Much of Greece was subjected to destruction of its industry (80% of which was destroyed), infrastructure (28% destroyed), ports, roads, railways and bridges (90%), forests and other natural resources (25%) and loss of civilian life (7–11% of its citizens). Over 40,000 civilians died in Athens alone from starvation, and tens of thousands more died from reprisals by Nazis and collaborators.

The Jewish population of Greece was nearly eradicated. Of its pre-war population of 75–77,000, only around 11–12,000 survived, either by joining the resistance or being hidden. Most of those who died were deported to Auschwitz, while those in Thrace, under Bulgarian occupation, were sent to Treblinka. The Italians did not deport Jews living in territory they controlled, but when the Germans took over, Jews living there were also deported.

At the same time the Greek Resistance was formed. These resistance groups launched guerrilla attacks against the occupying powers, fought against the collaborationist Security Battalions, and set up espionage networks. By late 1943 the resistance groups began to fight amongst themselves. When liberation of the mainland came in October 1944, Greece was in a state of political polarization, which soon led to the outbreak of the Greek Civil War. The subsequent civil war gave the opportunity to many prominent Nazi collaborators not only to escape punishment (because of their anti-communism), but to eventually become the ruling class of postwar Greece, after the communist defeat.

The Greek Resistance killed 21,087 Axis soldiers (17,536 Germans, 2,739 Italians, 1,532 Bulgarians) and captured 6,463 (2,102 Germans, 2,109 Italians, 2,252 Bulgarians), for the death of 20,650 Greek partisans and an unknown number captured.

Fall of Greece 

In the early morning hours of 28 October 1940, Italian Ambassador Emmanuel Grazzi woke Greek Premier Ioannis Metaxas and presented him an ultimatum. Metaxas rejected the ultimatum and Italian forces invaded Greek territory from Italian-occupied Albania less than three hours later. (The anniversary of Greece's refusal is now a public holiday in Greece.) Italian Prime Minister Benito Mussolini launched the invasion partly to prove that Italians could match the military successes of the German Army and partly because Mussolini regarded southeastern Europe as lying within Italy's sphere of influence.

The Hellenic Army proved to be a formidable opponent, and successfully exploited the mountainous terrain of Epirus. The Hellenic forces counterattacked and forced the Italians to retreat. By mid-December, the Greeks had occupied nearly one-quarter of Albania, before Italian reinforcements and the harsh winter stemmed the Greek advance. In March 1941, a major Italian counterattack failed. The initial Greek defeat of the Italian invasion is considered the first Allied land victory of the Second World War, although due to German intervention, it eventually resulted in a victory for the Axis. Fifteen of the 21 Greek divisions were deployed against the Italians, so only six divisions were facing the attack from German troops in the Metaxas Line (near the border between Greece and Yugoslavia/Bulgaria) during the first days of April. Greece received help from British Commonwealth troops, moved from Libya on the orders of Winston Churchill.

On 6 April 1941, Germany came to the aid of Italy and invaded Greece through Bulgaria and Yugoslavia. Greek and British Commonwealth troops fought back but were overwhelmed. On 20 April, after Greek resistance in the north had ceased, the Bulgarian Army entered Greek Thrace, without having fired a shot, with the goal of regaining its Aegean Sea outlet in Western Thrace and Eastern Macedonia. The Bulgarians occupied territory between the Strymon River and a line of demarcation running through Alexandroupoli and Svilengrad west of the Evros River. The Greek capital Athens fell on 27 April, and by 1 June, after the capture of Crete, all of Greece was under Axis occupation. After the invasion King George II fled, first to Crete and then to Cairo. A nominally Greek right-wing government ruled from Athens, but it was a puppet of the occupiers.

The Triple Occupation 
The occupation of Greece was divided among Germany, Italy and Bulgaria. German forces occupied the most strategically important areas, namely Athens, Thessaloniki with Central Macedonia and several Aegean Islands, including most of Crete. Initially, the German zone was ruled by the ambassador Günther Altenburg of the German Foreign Office and Field Marshal Wilhelm List. From 1942 onwards, the German occupation zone was ruled by the duumvirate of the plenipotentiary for South-Eastern Europe, Hermann Neubacher, and Field Marshal Alexander Löhr. In September–October 1943, Jürgen Stroop, the newly appointed Higher SS Police Leader, tried to challenge the Neubacher-Löhr duumvirate and was swiftly fired after less than a month on the job. Walter Schimana replaced Stroop as the Higher SS Police Leader in Greece and was able to establish a better working relationship with the Neubacher-Löhr duumvirate.

East Macedonia and Thrace came under Bulgarian occupation and were annexed to Bulgaria, which had long claimed these territories. The remaining two-thirds of Greece were occupied by Italy, with the Ionian Islands directly administered as Italian territories. Count Pellegrino Ghigi represented Italian interests with the Greek government while General Carlo Geloso commanded the 11th Army occupying Greece. Relations between the Germans and Italians were not good and frequently there were clashes between German and Italian soldiers. It was German policy to strongly discourage relationships between German servicemen and Greek women as the German leaders feared miscegenation between Germans and the (in the Nazi view) racially "inferior" Greeks. By contrast, the Italians had no such inhibitions, which created problems among Wehrmacht and SS officers. German officers often complained that the Italians were more interested in making love than in making war, and that the Italians lacked the "hardness" to wage a campaign against the Greek guerrillas because many Italian soldiers had Greek girlfriends. After the Italian capitulation in September 1943, the Italian zone was taken over by the Germans, who often attacked the Italian garrisons. There was a failed attempt by the British to take advantage of the Italian surrender to reenter the Aegean, resulting in the Dodecanese Campaign.

The German occupation zone

Economic exploitation and the Great Famine 

Greece suffered greatly during the occupation. The country's economy had already been devastated from the 6-month long war, and to it was added the relentless economic exploitation by the Nazis. Raw materials and food were requisitioned, and the collaborationist government was forced to pay the cost of the occupation, giving rise to inflation. Because the outflows of raw materials and products from Greece towards Germany weren't offset by German payments, substantial imbalances accrued in the settlement accounts at the Greek National Bank. In October 1942 the trading company DEGRIGES was founded; two months later, the Greek collaboration government was forced to agree to treat the balance as a loan without interest that was to be repaid once the war was over. At the end of the war, this forced loan amounted to 476 million Reichsmark (equivalent to  billion  euros).

Hitler's policy toward the economy of occupied Greece was termed Vergeltungsmassnahme, or, roughly, "retaliation measures", the "retaliation" being for Greece having chosen the wrong side; it was additionally motivated by a desire to "pluck out the best fruit" to plunder before the Italians could get it. Groups of economic advisers, businessmen, engineers and factory managers came from Germany with the task of seizing anything they deemed of economic value, with both the Economic Ministry and the Foreign Office involved in the operation; these men were not only in competition with the Italians to plunder the country, but also with each other. The primary occupation, however, was finding as much food as possible to sustain the German army. The occupying powers' requisitions and outright plunder, the drop in agricultural production from wartime disruption, the breakdown of the country's distribution networks due to a combination damage to infrastructure, the collapse of the central government and the fragmentation of the country at the hands of the Axis, coupled with hoarding by farmers, led to a severe shortage of food in the major urban centres in the winter of 1941–42. Given that even in peacetime, Greece was dependent on imports of wheat to cover about a third of its annual needs, the Allied blockade of German-dominated Europe further exacerbated the situation, creating the conditions for the "Great Famine" (Μεγάλος Λιμός): in the greater Athens–Piraeus area alone, some 40,000 people died of starvation, and by the end of the Occupation "it was estimated that the total population of Greece [...] was 300,000 less than it should have been because of famine or malnutrition" (P. Voglis).

Aid came at first from neutral countries like Sweden and Turkey (see SS Kurtuluş), but the overwhelming majority of food ended up in the hands of the government officials and black market traders who used their connection to the Axis authorities to "buy" the aid from them and then sell it on to the desperate population at enormously inflated prices. The great suffering and the pressure of the exiled Greek government eventually forced the British to partially lift the blockade, and from the summer of 1942 Canadian wheat began to be distributed under the auspices of the International Red Cross. Of the country's 7.3 million inhabitants in 1941, it is estimated that fully 2.5 million were recipients of this aid, of whom half lived in Athens, i.e. practically the total number of the capital's population. Although this aid alleviated the threat of starvation in the cities, little of it reached the countryside, which experienced its own period of famine in 1943–44. The rise of the armed Resistance resulted in major anti-partisan campaigns across the countryside by the Axis, which led to the wholesale burning of villages, destruction of fields, or mass executions as reprisals for guerrilla attacks. As P. Voglis writes, the German sweeps "[turned] producing areas into burned fields and pillaged villages, and the wealthy provincial towns into refugee settlements".

The Italian occupation zone 

The Italians occupied the bulk of the Greek mainland and most of the islands. Although several proposals for territorial annexation had been put forward in Rome, none were actually carried out during the war. This was due to pressure from the King of Italy, Victor Emmanuel III, and from the Germans, who were concerned of further alienating the Greek population, which was already strongly opposing the Bulgarian annexations. Moreover, much of this proposed "new Roman empire" in Greece consisted of poor rural areas. Such goals made little strategic or political sense. Nevertheless, in the Ionian Islands, long a target of Italian expansionism, and in the Cyclades, the Greek civil authorities were replaced by Italians in preparation for a post-war annexation. However, no formal announcement of annexation was ever made, and these islands remained in communication with Athens.

Italian policy promised that the region of Chameria (Thesprotia) in northwestern Greece, would be awarded to Albania after the end of the war. As such a local administration (Këshilla) was installed and armed groups were formed among members of the local Cham Albanian community. In the beginning, at least, collaboration was not a one-shot choice; Muslim communities followed different politics as per circumstances, alternating between collaboration, neutrality and, less frequently, resistance. Albanian and Greek communities changed sides by allying with the stronger available patron and shifting their allegiances when a more suitable one appeared. Instead, the events were part of a cycle of blood revenge between local communities over issues related to land ownership, state policies, sectarian hostilities, personal vendettas and the need to take a side in a chaotic situation, which only became nationalized during the war. Some numbers of the Cham Albanians, though the majority of their elites collaborated with the Axis, became part of a mixed EAM battalion at the end of the war, without having opportunity to give any significant contribution against the Germans. (For local developments at 1944–1945: see Expulsion of Cham Albanians article). After the war, a Special Court on Collaborators in Ioannina condemned, in absentia, 2,109 Cham collaborators of the Axis to death. However, the war crimes remained unpunished since the criminals had already fled abroad.

A part of the Vlach (Aromanian) population in the Pindus mountains and Western Macedonia also collaborated for a variety of reasons. Italian occupation forces were welcomed in some Aromanian villages as liberators, and Aromanians offered their services as guides or interpreters in exchange for favors. Under Alcibiades Diamandi, the pro-Italian Principality of the Pindus was declared, and 2000 locals joined Diamantis' Roman Legion, while Nicolaos Matussis had his own band of Aromanian followers which carried out raids at the service of Italian service departments. Most local Aromanians were not converted to Diamantis' vision of a Aromanian state in the Pindus and most remained loyal to the Greek nation, but some collaborated nevertheless because of latent pro-Romanian feelings, or anger toward the Greek government or its military authorities. The Legion collapsed in 1942 with the departure of the Italians, and most of its leaders fled into Romania or Greek cities. Most active members were convicted as war criminals in absentia, but in the course of the Greek Civil War in many cases their actions were forgotten, and many actively fought for the government against the communist guerrillas.

Compared to the other two zones, the Italian occupation regime was relatively mild, which can be seen from the relatively low number of executions and atrocities committed in the Italian zone of occupation when compared with the atrocities and executions committed in the German and Bulgarian zones. Furthermore, unlike the Germans, and aside from some local commanders, the Italian military protected the Jews in their zone. The Germans were purportedly perturbed as the Italians not only protected Jews on their territory, but in parts of occupied France, Greece, the Balkans, and elsewhere, where they protected local Jewish populations also. On 13 December 1942, Joseph Goebbels, Hitler's propaganda minister, wrote in his diary, "The Italians are extremely lax in the treatment of the Jews. They protect the Italian Jews both in Tunis and in occupied France and will not permit their being drafted for work or compelled to wear the Star of David. This shows once again that Fascism does not really dare to get down to fundamentals but is very superficial regarding problems of vital importance."

Significant mass reprisals did sometimes occur, such as the Domenikon massacre in which 150 Greek civilians were killed. As they controlled most of the countryside, the Italians were the first to face the rising resistance movement in 1942–43. By mid-1943, the Resistance had managed to expel a few Italian garrisons from some mountainous areas, including several towns, creating liberated zones ("Free Greece"). After the Italian armistice in September 1943, the Italian zone was taken over by the Germans. As a result, German anti-partisan and anti-Semitic policies were extended to it.

The Bulgarian occupation zone 

The Bulgarian Army entered Greece on 20 April 1941 on the heels of the Wehrmacht without having fired a shot. The Bulgarian occupation zone included the northeastern corner of the Greek mainland and the islands of Thasos and Samothrace i.e. the present-day region of East Macedonia and Thrace, except for the Evros prefecture, (at the Greek-Turkish border) which, because of its strategic value, was retained by the Germans, despite Bulgarian protests. Unlike Germany and Italy, Bulgaria officially annexed the occupied territories, which had long been a target of Bulgarian nationalism. East Macedonia and Thrace was part of the Ottoman Empire until 1913, when it became part of Bulgaria, following the Balkan Wars. Six years later, in 1919, after the end of World War I, it was annexed by Greece, following the signing of the Treaty of Neuilly (Greece was on the winning side of World War I, while Bulgaria was on the losing side).

Throughout the Bulgarian occupation zone, Bulgarian policy was that of extermination, expulsion and ethnic cleansing, aiming to forcibly Bulgarize, expel or even kill the rest of the Greeks. A massive Bulgarization campaign was launched, which saw all Greek officials (mayors, landowners, industrialists, school-teachers, judges, lawyers, priests, Hellenic Gendarmerie officers) deported. A ban was placed on the use of the Greek language, the names of towns and places changed to the forms traditional in Bulgarian. Even gravestones bearing Greek inscriptions were defaced.

The Bulgarian government tried to alter the ethnic composition of the region, by aggressively expropriating land and houses from Greeks in favor of settlers brought from Bulgaria, and introduced forced labor and economic restrictions on the activities of Greek businessmen, in an effort to force them to migrate to the German and Italian-occupied parts of Greece. Thus people were deprived of the right to work by a licensing system that banned the practice of a trade or profession without permission. Forced labour was introduced, and the authorities confiscated the estates of Greek landowners and gave their land to Bulgarian peasants (many of them brought from Bulgaria as settlers).

These policies led to an attempt to expel the Bulgarians with a spontaneous and badly organized uprising around Drama in late September 1941 (primarily guided by the Communist Party of Greece) which, however, was suppressed by the Bulgarian Army, and massive reprisals against Greek civilians followed. By late 1941, more than 100,000 Greeks were expelled from the Bulgarian occupation zone by late 1942. Bulgarian colonists were encouraged to settle in East Macedonia and Thrace by government credits and incentives, including houses and land confiscated from the natives.

The Bulgarian government's attempts to win the loyalty of the local Slavic-speaking population and recruit collaborators among them did see some success, with the Bulgarians being greeted as liberators, but the ethnic composition of the region meant that the vast majority of its inhabitants actively resisted the occupiers. East Macedonia and Thrace had an ethnically mixed population until the early 20th century, including Greeks, Turks, Slavic-speakers (some of them self-identifying as Greeks, others as Bulgarians) Jews, and Pomaks (a Muslim Slavic group). However, during the interwar years, the ethnic composition of the region's population had been dramatically changed, as Greek refugees from Anatolia settled in Macedonia and Thrace following the population exchange between Greece and Turkey. This meant that only a small minority of Slavic-speakers could be lured to collaborate with the occupiers.

Because of the harsh occupation policies, armed resistance in the Bulgarian zone was fierce and enjoyed almost universal support from the civilians; Greek guerrilla leaders such as Antonis Fosteridis engaged the Bulgarian military in many battles, and even penetrated into Bulgaria proper, raiding villages and capturing booty. However, in 1943, armed clashes began between Greek communist and right-wing groups, with the aim of securing control of the region following the anticipated Bulgarian withdrawal.

There were very few instances of collaboration by the Muslim minority in Western Thrace, that mainly resided in the Komotini and Xanthi prefectures.

Bulgarian activities in German-occupied Macedonia 

The Bulgarian government also attempted to extend its influence to central and west Macedonia. The German High Command approved the foundation of a Bulgarian military club in Thessaloniki, and Bulgarian officers organized supplying of food and provisions for the Slavic-speaking population in these regions, aiming to recruit collaborators and gather intelligence on what was happening in the German- and Italian-occupied zones. In 1942, the Bulgarian club asked assistance from the High Command in organizing armed units among those populations, but the Germans were initially very suspicious. Taking advantages of Italian incompetence and the German need for releasing troops on other fronts, since 1943 Sofia had been seeking to extend its control over the rest of Macedonia. After the Italian collapse in 1943, the Germans allowed the Bulgarians to intervene in Greek Central Macedonia, over the area between the Strymon and Axios rivers. The situation also forced the Germans to take control of Western Macedonia with the occasional interventions of Bulgarian troops. At that time the Greek guerrilla forces, especially the left-wing Greek People's Liberation Army (ELAS) were gaining more and more strength in the area. As a result, armed collaborationist militias composed of pro-Bulgarian Slavic-speakers, known as Ohrana, were formed in 1943 in the districts of Pella, Florina and Kastoria. The ELAS units joined EAM in 1944 before the end of the occupation.

Bulgarian withdrawal 
The Soviet Union declared war on the Kingdom of Bulgaria in early September 1944. Bulgaria withdrew from the central parts of Greek Macedonia after the pro-Soviet coup in the country on 9 September 1944. At that time it declared war on Germany, but the Bulgarian army remained in Eastern Macedonia and Thrace, where there were several limited attacks from withdrawing German troops in the middle of September. Bulgaria hoped to keep these territories after the war. The Soviet Union initially also believed it was possible to include at least Western Thrace in the post-war borders of Bulgaria and thereby to secure a strategic outlet to the Aegean Sea. But the United Kingdom, whose troops advanced towards Greece at the same time, stated that the withdrawal of Bulgarian troops from all occupied territories was a precondition for a ceasefire agreement with Bulgaria. As result on 10 October, the Bulgarian army and administration began evacuating and after two weeks withdrew from the area. Meanwhile, around 90,000 Bulgarians left the area, nearly half of them settlers and the rest locals. The administrative power was handed over by the already ruling Bulgarian communist partisans to local subdivisions of ELAS.

In 1945 the former Bulgarian authorities, including those in Greece, were put on trial before "People's Courts" in post-war Bulgaria for their actions during the war. In general thousands of people were sentenced to prison, while ca. 2,000 received death sentences.

Regional level policies 

Many Slavophones of Macedonia, in particular of Kastoria and Florina provinces, collaborated with Axis forces and came out openly for Bulgaria. These Slavophones considered themselves Bulgarian. In the first two years of occupation, a group of this community believed that the Axis would win the war, spelling the demise of Greek rule in the region and its annexation by Bulgaria. The first non-communist resistance organization that emerged in the area had as main opponents members of the Aromanian- and Slav-speaking minorities, as well as the communists, rather than the Germans themselves. Because of the strong presence of German troops and the general distrust of Slavophones by the Greeks, the communist organisations EAM and ELAS had difficulties in Florina and Kastoria. The majority of the Slav-speakers in Macedonia after mid-1943 joined EAM and were allowed to retain their organization. In October 1944 they deserted and departed to Yugoslavia. In November 1945, after the end of the war, some of then tried to capture Florina but were repulsed by the ELAS.

Axis atrocities 

Increasing attacks by partisans in the latter years of the occupation resulted in a number of executions and wholesale slaughter of civilians in reprisal. In total, the Germans executed some 21,000 Greeks, the Bulgarians executed some 40,000 and the Italians executed some 9,000. By June 1944, between them the Axis powers had "raided 1,339 towns, boroughs and villages, of which 879, or two-thirds, were completely wiped out, leaving more than a million people homeless" (P. Voglis) in the course of their anti-partisan sweeps, mostly in the areas of Central Greece, Western Macedonia and the Bulgarian occupation zone.

The most infamous examples in the German zone are those of the village of Kommeno on 16 August 1943, where 317 inhabitants were executed by the 1. Gebirgs-Division and the village torched; the "Holocaust of Viannos" on 14–16 September 1943, in which over 500 civilians from several villages in the region of Viannos and Ierapetra in Crete were executed by the 22. Luftlande Infanterie-Division; the "Massacre of Kalavryta" on 13 December 1943, in which Wehrmacht troops of the 117th Jäger Division carried out the extermination of the entire male population and the subsequent total destruction of the town; the "Distomo massacre" on 10 June 1944, where units of the Waffen-SS Polizei Division looted and burned the village of Distomo in Boeotia resulting in the deaths of 218 civilians; the  3 October 1943 "Lingiades massacre" where the German army murdered in reprisal nearly 100 people in the village of Lingiades, 13 kilometres outside Ioannina; and the "Holocaust of Kedros" on 22 August 1944 in Crete, where 164 civilians were executed and nine villages were dynamited after being looted. At the same time, in the course of the concerted anti-guerrilla campaign, hundreds of villages were systematically torched and almost 1,000,000 Greeks left homeless.

Two other notable acts of brutality were the massacres of Italian troops at the islands of Cephalonia and Kos in September 1943, during the German takeover of the Italian occupation areas. In Cephalonia, the 12,000-strong Italian 33rd Infantry Division "Acqui" was attacked on 13 September by elements of the 1. Gebirgs-Division with support from Stukas, and forced to surrender on 21 September after suffering some 1,300 casualties. The next day, the Germans began executing their prisoners and did not stop until more than 4,500 Italians had been shot. The 4,000 or so survivors were put aboard ships for the mainland, but some of them sank after hitting mines in the Ionian Sea, where another 3,000 were lost. The Cephalonia massacre serves as the background for the novel Captain Corelli's Mandolin.

Collaboration

Government 
The Third Reich had no long-term plans for Greece and Hitler had already decided that a domestic puppet regime would be the least expensive drain on German efforts and resources as the invasion of the Soviet Union was imminent. According to a report by Foreign Office delegate of the 12th Army, Felix Benzler, the formation of a puppet government wasn't an easy task "because it is very difficult to persuade qualified civilians to participate in any form". The most influential Greek personalities hardly wished to make their re-entry into public life at such a moment, while archbishop Chrysanthos of Athens refused to swear such an Axis puppet. Suspicious of the Greeks' capacity for causing problems, the Axis decided to withhold international recognition from the new regime, which remained without a Foreign Minister for its entire lifetime.

General Georgios Tsolakoglou – who had signed the armistice treaty with the Wehrmacht – was appointed as prime minister of the Nazi puppet regime in Athens. Neither Tsolakoglou nor his cabinet of equally inexperienced generals had any previous political experience. The civilian ministers were also an unimpressive group without political background. The government itself was wracked by internal disputes and held in low esteem by the Greek public, especially after the Italians replaced the Germans throughout much of the country in June 1941. The puppet government was kept under strict Axis control. Two Axis plenipotentiaries, Gunther Altenburg and Pellegrino Ghigi, had the power to recommend the appointment and dismissal of Greek officials and were the key civilian figures in shaping Axis policy towards Greece. In addition, there was no clear distinction between the civil and military administration, while even the military administration was divided among various sectors (Italian 11th army, German 12th army, "fortress Crete" etc.) . In December 1942, Tsolakologlou was succeeded by Konstantinos Logothetopoulos, a professor of medicine whose main qualification for Prime Minister seemed to be his marriage to the niece of German Field Marshal Wilhelm List. Ioannis Rallis became head of the regime as of April 1943 and was responsible for the creation of the Greek collaborationist Security Battalions.

Civil administration and armed groups

As in other European countries, there were Greeks willing to collaborate with the occupying force. However, few of the members of the Security battalions shared a pro-German ideology. The majority convinced themselves that the British approved anti-communist activity; others enlisted because of opportunistic advancement, while most of them came from a pro-royalist background.

Occupation authorities were reluctant to arm potential groups willing to fight the left-wing EAM resistance due to the absence of a fascist movement in Greece and the general dislike of the Germans by the Greek population. Fascist organizations supported by the Germans were the National Union of Greece (Ethniki Enosis Ellados, EEE), the EKK (Ethnikon Kyriarchon Kratos), the Greek National Socialist Party (Elliniko Ethnikososialistiko Komma, EEK) led by George S. Mercouris, and other minor pro-Nazi, fascist or anti-Semitic organizations such as the Hellenic Socialist Patriotic Organization (ESPO) or the "Iron Peace" (Sidira Eirini). Cooperation of civil servants with the resistance, in particular the EAM, occurred even before a widescale resistance movement unfolded.

For the purposes of civil administration before the invasion, Greece was divided into 37 prefectures. Following the occupation, the prefectures of Drama, Kavalla, Rhodope and Serres were annexed by Bulgaria and no longer under the control of the Greek government. The remaining 33 prefectures had a concurrent military administration by Italian or German troops. In 1943, Attica and Boeotia was split into separate prefectures.

Resistance

Outbreak of the resistance 
Few Greeks actively cooperated with the Nazis: most chose either the path of passive acceptance or active resistance. Active Greek resistance started immediately as many Greeks fled to the hills, where a partisan movement was born. One of the most touching episodes of the early resistance is said to have taken place just after the Wehrmacht reached the Acropolis on 27 April. The Germans ordered the flag guard, Evzone Konstandinos Koukidis, to retire the Greek flag. The Greek soldier obeyed, but when he was done, he wrapped himself in the flag and threw himself off the plateau where he died. Some days later, when the Reichskriegsflagge was waving on the Acropolis' uppermost spot, two Athenian youngsters, Manolis Glezos and Apostolos Santas, climbed by night on the Acropolis and tore down the flag.

The first signs of armed resistance activity manifested themselves in northern Greece, where resentment at the Bulgarian annexations ran high, in early autumn 1941. The Germans responded swiftly, torching several villages and executing 488 civilians. The brutality of these reprisals led to a collapse of the early guerrilla movement. It was revived in 1942 at a much greater scale. The first event that signaled the beginning of organized, armed opposition to the occupation forces occurred in September 1942 when the Greek Fascist Party (EEE) Club in downtown Athens was blown up by the Panhellenic Union of Fighting Youths (PEAN), a right-wing Greek resistance organization. Attacks on Axis personnel became more frequent from that month.

In 25 November, the resistance together with the British mission destroyed the Gorgopotamos viaduct in Central Greece, disrupting the flow of Axis supplies to the North African front. By March–April, the andartes were launching direct attacks on Italian guard posts and barracks, while on 16 April, an Italian report noted that "control through out the north-east, centre and south-west of Greece remains very precarious, not to say nonexistent".

Major resistance groups 

On 27 September 1941, the National Liberation Front (EAM) was established. It was nominally a "popular front" organization composed of a coalition of the Communist Party of Greece (KKE) and five other left-wing parties. EAM was virtually controlled by the KKE, although initially, the secretive and generally unpopular Communist party was successful in concealing this fact. 

The military wing of EAM was the Greek People's Liberation Army (ELAS). Its first guerrilla band had been formed in Central Greece, under the leadership of Aris Velouchiotis, a declared Communist. EAM increased in size and its central committee sought a more experienced military figure to take command. Napoleon Zervas, the leader of a rival guerrilla group, was approached but could not be enticed to join ELAS. The post was filled by Stefanos Sarafis, a former Greek army officer and non-communist. Immediately upon assuming command of ELAS, Sarafis set about reforming its haphazardly organized and commanded bands. 

By September 1943, the reorganization of ELAS bands along conventional lines had been completed, and ELAS strength was about 15,000 fighters with additionally 20,000 reserves. Eventually, the EAM incorporated 90% of the Greek resistance movement, boasted a total membership of over 1,500,000, including 50,000 armed guerrillas, and controlled much of rural mainland Greece and attracted large numbers of non-Communists. The first contact between Soviet officers and members of the Communist Party and the EAM-ELAS forces occurred at 28 July 1943.

The National Republican Greek League (EDES) was led by Napoleon Zervas, a former army officer and republican. EDES was formed on 9 September 1941 and was at the beginning thoroughly republican and anti-monarchist, but also attracted a few monarchists and other right-wing supporters. The British were instrumental in the development of EDES, hoping it would become a counterweight to ELAS. Throughout the occupation period, Zervas did not attempt to change his doctrine and EDES remained clearly a guerrilla force. Its main theatre of operation was Epirus. Because it was a particularly poor district, most of the logistical support was provided by the British. When EDES was finally disbanded at the fall of 1944, it had about 12,000 fighters, in addition to 5,000 reserves.

Another armed resistance group was the National and Social Liberation (EKKA), led by Colonel Dimitrios Psarros. In general, most of the major guerrilla groups were at least moderately republican in orientation, whereas the Greek government-in-exile had been connected with monarchism, the Metaxas dictatorship, defeatism, and abandonment of the homeland to the invader.

Developments and signs of civil war 

From its very beginnings, ELAS had sought to absorb or eliminate the rest of the Greek resistance groups and achieved some success in that effort. It firmly established and maintained a clear advantage over its rivals in terms of overall numbers, organization and the amount of territory controlled. ELAS's execution of rival EKKAS's leader, Dimitrios Psarros, later in spring of 1944 was a typical example of its ruthless determination to monopolise the armed resistance. Generally, ELAS clashed with the other resistance groups nearly as often as it fired upon the occupation forces.

Velouchiotis, though a charismatic leader, was regarded with suspicion by a large part of EAM/ELAS and the Communist party. His early pre-eminence in the resistance had been achieved through exemplary executions and the torture of traitors, informers, and others. ELAS's critics also accused Velouchiotis, claiming the organization was not above open collusion with the Axis. Meanwhile, on 9 March 1943, Zervas repudiated EDES's earlier republicanism of loyalty to the exiled King George. He thus managed to achieve closer ties with the British mission. With the surrender of Italy in September 1943, Italian forces in Greece either surrendered to the Joint Resistance headquarters (composed of ELAS, EDES, EKKA and the British) or to the Germans.

EAM accused its rival organizations, and particularly EDES, of collaboration with the occupation forces. However, this accusation was as yet unfounded, at least in regards to EDES's guerilla branch. Right-wing resistance groups, including EDES, lacked a nationwide organizational apparatus and did not follow a consistent strategy, while their relative weakness compared to EAM resulted in complete dependence on the British and to surreptitious collaboration with the Axis. Over time, the EDES Central Committee and political apparatus in Athens, directed by Stylianos Gonatas, became increasingly ineffective, estranged from the EDES guerrillas in the mountains (headed by Zervas) and winning the particular enmity of the organization because of Gonatas's support for the collaborationist Security Battalions. EDES called for a future democratic constitution and the punishment of wartime collaborators.

On 12 October 1943, elements of ELAS struck EDES units in the mountains of Thessaly, beginning what came to be called the "First Round" of the Greek civil war. As a result, EDES was confined to Epirus, Zervas's birthplace, and only managed to survive due to British support. British officials stated that the Germans would soon leave the country and that "at all costs Greece must not become communist".

During this period, the British intelligence suspected the EAM/ELAS resistance for collaboration with the Axis. As such EAM/ELAS refused to provide support to the British units and on some occasions even betrayed them to the Germans. There is documentary evidence that Zervas had certain understandings with the Axis commanders and with British support, he turned against ELAS during a ceasefire with the Germans. Zervas, undoubtedly aimed to get rid of the Axis, but lacked the qualities and the organizational background to form a strong resistance movement and saw EDES as a tool to fight the occupation troops and advance his own fortunes. For Zervas the first priority was EAM/ELAS. Reports sent on 10 August 1943 by the German Chief of Staff in Giannina suggested that he believed Zervas was 'loyal' to their operations. According to German post-war testimonies, resistance was temporarily limited in Epirus and the local population was terrorized partly due to the reprisals and executions in Paramythia in September 1943. During October 1943-October 1944 Zervas consistently rejected active collaboration though he favoured a temporary coexistence. According to German records, a conspiracy of German-Ralli's collaborationist government-British can't be sustained. This policy of coexistence enabled the Germans to concentrate their operations against ELAS. Zervas' pro-royalist tendencies and close collaboration both with the Germans and the British Office destroyed EDES' initial republican and democratic ideology. In 1944, EDES membership no longer represented the anti-monarchists but had come to reflect a broad spectrum of right-wing forces which opposed both the Germans and ELAS. A short-lived German attempt to coopt EDES and use them against ELAS partisans failed and by July 1944 EDES attacks against the Germans resumed. A German report of 17 July 1944, stated that "the destruction of the EDES pocket" is of vital importance.

Final months of Axis occupation 
On 29 February 1944, an agreement was signed in Plaka Bridge in Pindus among the armed groups of the Greek resistance: EAM, EDES and the EKKA. According to this, they agreed to refrain from infringing on each other's territory and that all future efforts would be directed against the Germans rather than each other. This marked the end of the "First Round" of the Greek civil war. A conference in Lebanon on 17–20 May 1944, where representatives from all resistance organizations and the Greek government-in-exile participated, the unification of all resistance groups under a "Government of National Unity", headed by Georgios Papandreou was agreed. EAM-ELAS was granted one-fourth of the cabinet posts in the new government.

ELAS, and to a lesser extent EDES and the other surviving resistance groups, assumed control of the countryside, but all groups refrained from trying to seize control of the Athens-Piraeus area, in accordance with their previous agreements. In the resulting "Caserta Agreement", signed on 26 September 1944, EDES, ELAS, and the Greek government-in-exile, agreed to place their forces under the command of British Lt. General Ronald Scobie, designated to represent the Allied High Command in Greece, for the purpose of driving the Axis out of Greece. ELAS and EDES also agreed to allow the landing of British forces in Greece, to refrain from any attempt to seize power on their own, and to support the return of the Greek Government of National Unity under Georgios Papandreou.

The Holocaust in Greece 

Prior to World War II, there existed two main groups of Jews in Greece: the scattered Romaniote communities which had existed in Greece since antiquity; and the approximately 56,000-strong Sephardi Jewish community of Thessaloniki, originally Jews fleeing the Spanish Inquisition who were guaranteed safe shelter by Ottoman Sultan Bayazid II, who ordered all regional governors to welcome Jewish refugees onto their shores, with later Ottoman governments continuing the policies of granting citizenship and shelter to Jews fleeing persecution by Christian rulers.

The Jews of Greece were originally mostly Romaniote Jews who spoke a Greek dialect but with the mass arrival of Sephardim from Spain, many of these became assimilated into the newly dominant Sephardic culture and Ladino language among the Jewish community. Jews had been the majority in Thessaloniki for centuries, and remained so at the end of Ottoman rule on the eve of the Balkan Wars, although this majority was lost as the Jewish community declined from 90,000 down to 56,000 after the collapse of the Ottoman Empire, including anti-Jewish (and anti-Ladino) discrimination, land confiscations, the Great Fire of Thessaloniki and the reconstruction afterwards which displaced the Jewish community. The Jewish communities of Athens, the islands and Epirus were integrated into Greek public life, while the picture was more complicated in the traditionally Ladino-speaking Thessaloniki community. Although the Greek Jewish community was used to Jewish-Christian tensions that often had origins in the economic rivalries, they were completely unprepared for the forms of anti-Semitism which had matured in Germany.

Despite some assistance from the surrounding Greek population, what was left of the Jewish community in Thessaloniki would be almost entirely annihilated by the Holocaust; only 1950 individuals survived. Only one Jewish family from Thessaloniki, once called the "mother of Israel", survived intact.
In total, at least 81% (around 60,000) of Greece's total pre-war Jewish population perished, with the percentage ranging from 91% in Thessaloniki to 50% in Athens, and less in other provincial areas such as Volos (36%). The low rate in Volos was because of coordination by Rabbi Pesach with the regions's bishop, who was tipped off by the German consul in Volos, and the actions of the local Greek community that provided them with resources during their time in hiding. In the Bulgarian zone, death rates surpassed 90%. In Zakynthos, all 275 Jews survived, hidden in the island's interior.

In the German zone 

When the occupation zones were drawn up, Thessaloniki came under German control, while Thrace came under Bulgarian control. The Greek army evacuated Thessaloniki in early 1941, and the population was urged to stock up on supplies in preparation for the hard times ahead; before the arrival of Germans, local anti-Semites began posting warnings on Jewish businesses saying "Jews Not Welcome Here". The German occupation of the city began on 8 April 1941. On 15 April the Jewish leadership within the city was arrested, and in June, the Rosenburg Commando began confiscating Jewish cultural property including manuscripts and art, and sending it back to Germany. Significant hardship occurred in the winter of 1941–1942, as refugees streamed in from the hinterlands of Greek Macedonia and Thrace, straining food supplies beyond their limit and causing starvation and typhus outbreaks, combined with summary executions of the Jewish population during the situation by the Germans; during some parts of the winter, 60 Jews died each day. The Germans made an effort to spread anti-Semitic sentiments among the local population, and revived local anti-Semitic publications that had been banned under the Metaxas regime.

For the first year of the German occupation, neither the Nuremberg Laws nor any specific anti-Semitic measures were applied, although there were some unorganized incidents by local anti-Semites. However, since 1937 but especially during this year, the Germans undertook a systematic investigation of the Jewish community and its assets, which included having Hans Reegler, a half-Greek half-German agent who pretended to be a British Jew named William Lions, assemble a comprehensive network of informants that compiled all the necessary information on individuals and assets of value.

In July 1942, forced labor was imposed on the Jewish population by Doctor Max Merten, the German chief civilian administrator of Thessaloniki. Merten ordered all Jews between the ages of 18 and 45 to report to Eleftherios Square at 8 in the morning. In a "ritual humiliation" in extreme heat, fully clothed, the 9,000 men were forced to take part in a "gymnastics drill" lasting six and a half hours, under the threat of being beaten, whipped, shot or set upon by dogs if they did not do as they were told. They were forced to gaze straight at the sun the whole time, and if their eyes moved, they would be whipped or otherwise punished. The "drill" also included running long distances, moving about on all fours, rolling in dust and performing somersaults. In the following days, several of the men died from brain haemorrhages or meningitis.

In October 1942, Merten implemented measures to extract any and all objects of value (jewelry, etc.) from the Jewish community. Merten, 28 years old at the time, was "above all an extortionist". He allowed exemptions from his forced labor programme for large amounts of money, paid in cash stuffed in sacks brought to his office by wheelbarrow. Salonica's Chief Rabbi, Zevi Koretz was a "naïve partner" of Merten; he acquiesced to all of Merten's demands, thinking that by doing so he was saving his people from extermination; however despite his good faith, he made it easier for the Germans to implement their plans.

In December 1942, Jewish cemeteries were looted. The Germans demolished the old Jewish cemetery in Thessaloniki, which dated back to the 15th century Spanish expulsions of Sephardim so the ancient tombstones could be used as building material for sidewalks and walls. They were also used to build a public baths and a swimming pool in the city. The site of the old cemetery is today occupied by the campus of the Aristotle University of Thessaloniki.

In 1943, Jews in the German zones were forced to wear the Star of David, and their residences were similarly marked, so they could be easily identified and further isolated from the rest of Greek society. Jewish families were kicked out of their homes and arrested while the Nazi-controlled press turned public opinion by spreading anti-Semitism against them. As spring approached, Jews were shoved into ghettos, the largest of which was called Baron Hirsch, after a Jewish railroad builder in the Habsburg Empire. In this camp, by early March, 2500 Jews were squeezed into 593 small rooms. Signs written in Greek, German and Ladino warned Jews not to exit, and the non-Jewish population to not enter, on pain of death. Throughout the night, German officers forced the Jewish inmates to perform traditional dances for their "entertainment". At the end of their stay, the railroad to Salonica that had been built by the historical Baron Hirsch, originally intended to help Jews escape from Russian pogroms, was used to send Salonica's Jews north to Auschwitz.

Despite warnings of impending deportations, most Jews were reluctant to leave their homes, although several hundred were able to flee the city. The Germans and Bulgarians began mass deportations in March 1943, sending the Jews of Thessaloniki and Thrace in packed boxcars to the distant Auschwitz and Treblinka death camps. By the summer of 1943, the Jews of the German and Bulgarian zones were gone and only those in the Italian zone remained. Jewish property in Thessaloniki was distributed to Greek 'caretakers' who were chosen by special committee, the "Service for the Disposal of Jewish Property" (YDIP). Instead of giving apartments and businesses to the many refugees, they were most often given to friends and relatives of committee members or collaborators.

In the Italian zone 

In September 1943, after the Italian collapse, the Germans turned their attention to the Jews of Athens and the rest of formerly Italian-occupied Greece. There their propaganda was not as effective, as the ancient Romaniote Jewish communities were well-integrated into the Orthodox Greek society and could not easily be singled out from the Christians, who in turn were more ready to resist the German authorities' demands. The Archbishop of Athens Damaskinos ordered his priests to ask their congregations to help the Jews and sent a strong-worded letter of protest to the collaborationist authorities and the Germans. Many Orthodox Christians risked their lives hiding Jews in their apartments and homes, despite the threat of imprisonment. Even the Greek police ignored instructions to turn over Jews to the Germans. When Jewish community leaders appealed to Prime Minister Ioannis Rallis, he tried to alleviate their fears by saying that the Jews of Thessaloniki had been guilty of subversive activities and that this was the reason they were deported.

At the same time, Elias Barzilai, the Grand Rabbi of Athens, was summoned to the Department of Jewish Affairs and told to submit a list of names and addresses of members of the Jewish community. Instead, he destroyed the community records, thus saving the lives of thousands of Athenian Jews. He advised the Jews of Athens to flee or go into hiding. A few days later, the Rabbi himself was spirited out of the city by EAM-ELAS fighters and joined the resistance. EAM-ELAS helped hundreds of Jews escape and survive (especially officer Stefanos Sarafis), many of whom stayed with the resistance as fighters and/or interpreters.

In the Bulgarian zone 

In March 1943 the vast majority of the Jewish population, 4,058 of the 4,273 was rounded up and sent to local warehouses by the Bulgarian occupation authorities. They were initially sent by train to concentration camps in Bulgaria. Kept under inhumane conditions, they were informed by the Bulgarians that they would be sent to Palestine. However, the deportees could not be convinced. Except for five who died in the Bulgarian camps they were sent to Treblinka extermination camp where they died in the following days. By the end of March 97% of the local Jewish community was exterminated.

Liberation and aftermath 

On 20 August 1944, the Red Army invaded Romania. The Romanian Army collapsed, the German 6th Army was encircled and destroyed while the German 8th Army retreated into the Carpathians. Accelerating the collapse was the coup in Bucharest on 23 August 1944 as King Michael dismissed Marshal Ion Antonescu as Prime Minister and declared war on Germany. Within a matter of days, most of Romania was occupied by the Soviet Union including most importantly, the Ploesti oil fields, which were Germany's most important source of oil. Germany had occupied Greece in 1941 out of the fear that British bombers based in Greece would bomb the Romanian oil fields and deprive the Reich of the oil that powered its war machine. On 23 August 1944, at a meeting at his headquarters, Adolf Hitler told Field Marshal Maximilian von Weichs, the commander of the German forces in the Balkans, that with the Romanian oil fields lost, there was now no more point in occupying Greece and he should begin preparations for a withdrawal from Greece at once.

The German troops evacuated Athens on 12 October 1944, and by the end of the month, they had withdrawn from mainland Greece. The first British troops under General Scobie arrived in Athens on 14 October 1944. Four days later, the Greek government-in-exile returned to the Greek capital. Conflict between the monarchist Right and the republican and communist Left soon erupted, despite the initiatives of Prime Minister Georgios Papandreou. On 1 December, the government decreed that all guerrilla groups were to be disarmed. On 2 December, the six EAM ministers in the Government of National Unity resigned in protest, and on 4 December Papandreou himself resigned too. A new government was formed by Themistoklis Sofoulis. The immediate cause of the fighting was an unsanctioned EAM demonstration in Athens' Syntagma Square on Sunday, 3 December 1944, which turned violent when gunfire erupted. Meanwhile, General Scobie promptly ordered all ELAS units to leave Athens within seventy-two hours, and on the following day he declared martial law. The clashes ended on the night of 5 January, and ELAS began a general withdrawal from the Greek capital.

Negotiations between the newly established Greek government and EAM concluded at 12 February 1945, with the Treaty of Varkiza. This provided a temporary respite from open warfare but Greece was in ruins. The country remained politically divided and unstable. Several anti-left elements, friendly to the former Security Battalions, had been appointed to key posts in the Ministry of War, while thoughts of allowing former andartes to enter the new National Guard were abandoned. This policy made an impartial solution to Greece's security problems virtually impossible, and undermined the moral basis for the British doctrine of non-interference in internal Greek affairs. British Foreign Office was also fearful of Soviet influence in Greece. Such developments infuriated a part of the EAM members. One of them was Velouchiotis who was also denounced by the Communist Party and decided to continue his guerrilla activity. After a few months, he was hunted down by government units and executed. Official policy towards Axis collaborators was milder and more hesitant than perhaps anywhere else in Europe. Alexandros Lambou, a Pangalos follower and head of the special security police during the war period, was sentenced to death, but most of his co-defendants received short prison terms. During 1945, more than 80,000 people were prosecuted. The judges, many of whom had served during the occupation period, sentenced leftists harshly, and wartime collaborators lightly. US and UK intelligence opposed the appointment of Zervas as a minister citing their suspicions of his collaboration with Nazi Germany.

Greece's recovery from the devastation of the World War II and Axis occupation lagged far behind that of the rest of Europe. About 8% of the Greek population of  had died during the conflicts and the occupation. Sanitation conditions were deplorable, and the health of those who had survived was imperilled by a resurgence of malaria and tuberculosis, the lack of medicines and medical materials, inadequate diet, and the breakdown of preventive measures. One-fourth of the villages had been burned, and over 100,000 buildings destroyed or heavily damaged. Nearly 700,000 of the total Greek population were refugees and lacked the basic necessities of life. Famine was narrowly averted in 1945 only by massive aid provided by the Allies and the United Nations Relief and Rehabilitation Administration (UNRRA). In the second half of 1945 UNRRA delivered to Greece some $171 million in goods. In the first year after the liberation, over 1.7 million tons of food were provided by UNRRA and the Allies. Nevertheless, a minimum daily ration of 2,000 calories proved impossible.

Influence in post-war culture 
The Axis occupation of Greece, specifically the Greek islands, has a significant presence in English-language books and films. Real special forces raids, e.g., Ill Met by Moonlight or fictional special forces raids The Guns of Navarone, Escape to Athena and They Who Dare (1954), and the fictional occupation narrative Captain Corelli's Mandolin are examples. Notable Greek movies referring to the period, the war and the occupation are The Germans Strike Again, What did you do in the war, Thanasi? and Ipolochagos Natassa. The Italian film Mediterraneo, which won the 1991 Academy Award for Best Foreign Language Film, tells the story of an idyllic Greek island where the residents absorb the 8 Italian occupiers into their daily lives.

Notable personalities 
Greek collaborators:
 Lt General Georgios Tsolakoglou, Prime Minister 1941–42
 Konstantinos Logothetopoulos, Prime Minister 1942–43
 Ioannis Rallis, Prime Minister 1943–44
 Sotirios Gotzamanis, Finance Minister 1941–43
 Major General Georgios Bakos, Army Minister 1941–43
 Colonel Ioannis Plytzanopoulos, head of the Security Battalions
 Colonel Georgios Poulos, SS collaborator
 George Seremetis, mayor of Thessaloniki
 Ioannis Voulpiotis, representative of Siemens in Greece

Greek Resistance leaders:
 Aris Velouchiotis, chief ELAS captain
 Napoleon Zervas, military leader of EDES
 Dimitrios Psarros, military leader of EKKA
 General Stefanos Sarafis, military commander of ELAS
 Georgios Siantos, political leader of EAM
 Markos Vafiades, senior ELAS captain in Macedonia
 Evripidis Bakirtzis, head of the PEEA
 Komninos Pyromaglou, political leader of EDES
 Georgios Kartalis, political leader of EKKA
 Vasilios Sachinis, leader of Northern Epirus Liberation Front (MAVI)
 Georgios Petrakis (Petrakogiorgis), partisan leader in Crete
Other Greek personalities
 Angelos Evert, Athens City Police Chief
 Damaskinos, Archbishop of Athens
 Manolis Glezos and Apostolos Santas
 Elias Degiannis
 George Psychoundakis, Cretan partisan

German officials:
 Ambassador Günther Altenburg, German Plenipotentiary
 Hermann Neubacher, Reich Special Envoy, 1942–44
 Jürgen Stroop, HSSPF August–October 1943
 Walter Schimana, HSSPF October 1943-October 1944
 Captain Anton Burger, SD February–September 1944
 Colonel Walter Blume, SD Commandant, October 1943-September 1944
 General Alexander Löhr, Commander, Army Group E, C-in-C South-East
 General Hubert Lanz, Commander, XXII Mountain Army Corps
 General Hellmuth Felmy, Military Commander, Southern Greece
 General Walter Stettner, Commander, 1st Mountain Division
 General Karl von Le Suire, Commander, 117th Jäger Division
 General Hartwig von Ludwiger, Commander, 104th Jäger Division
 General Friedrich-Wilhelm Müller, Commander, "Fortress Crete"
 General Heinrich Kreipe, Commander, 22nd Air Landing Infantry Division
 Dr. Max Merten, Chief of Military Administration, Salonika
 Dieter Wisliceny, responsible for the deportation of Salonika's Jews
 Friedrich Schubert, Wehrmacht paramilitary Sonderführer in Crete and Macedonia

Italian officials:
 Ambassador Pellegrino Ghigi, Italian Plenipotentiary 1941–43
 General Carlo Geloso, Commander, Italian 11th Armyand Supreme Commander of mainland Greece (Supergrecia)
 Admiral Inigo Campioni, Governor of the Dodecaneseand Supreme Commander of the Aegean (Superegeo)
Leaders of secessionist movements:
 Andon Kalchev, pro-Bulgarian leader of the Ohrana
 Alcibiades Diamandi, leader of the Aromanian "Roman Legion" (an organization of Aromanians who supported the Italian army) and promoter of the idea for a Aromanian-run, independent canton
 Nicolaos Matussis, close associate of Diamandi

British agents:
 Brigadier Eddie Myers, SOE
 Colonel Christopher Woodhouse, SOE
 Patrick Leigh Fermor, SOE
 N. G. L. Hammond, SOE
 W. Stanley Moss, SOE

See also 
German reparations for World War II

References

Bibliography

Further reading

External links 
 Greece’s sacrifices during World War II (plates from the book published in 1946 by Konstantinos Doxiadis on behalf of the Greek government)
 The Catastrophe of Salonikan Jewry and the Looting of their Property , online lecture by Dr. Nikos Tzafleris, Postdoctoral Researcher at the Aristotle University of Thessaloniki, yadvashem.org. Retrieved 8 December 2014
 Memorandum to the Note to the Greek Government, 6 April 1941, historicalresources.org. Retrieved 8 December 2014
 Note of the Reich Government to the Greek Government, 6 April 1941, historicalresources.org. Retrieved 8 December 2014
 Greece during World War II, ww2.gr. Retrieved 8 December 2014
 Pictures of the German Army in Greece and Greek collaborationists, ethniko.net. Retrieved 8 December 2014

 
Occupation
Axis occupation
Jewish Greek history
Axis occupation
Greece
Greece
Antisemitism in Greece
Articles containing video clips
Military occupations of Greece
Axis powers
Germany–Greece military relations